Although the term "alpinism" has become synonymous with sporting achievement, pyreneism, appearing in the 19th century, distanced itself from it by considering the physical experience of the mountains as inseparable from the aesthetic and cultural emotion.

We cannot mention the word "pyreneism" without speaking about its inventor, the historian and geographer Henri Beraldi. Indeed, as the origin of the word alpinism goes back to 1876 (the French alpine club was created in Paris in 1874), we find the term pyreneism for the first time in the foreword of his Excursion biblio-pyrénéenne ("Biblio-pyrenean excursion") that introduces volume 1 of 100 years in the Pyrenees in 1898:

Contrary to what one may think, when the word "pyreneism" was launched by Henri Beraldi in his 7-volume authoritative book, it was not meant to stand opposite to the word "alpinism".

Pyreneism in dictionaries 
The word had to wait until the last quarter of the 19th century in order to appear in the French dictionaries, always with a joint reference to alpinism considered as a sport and pyreneism as only one of its variants.

 The 10-volume "Grand dictionnaire encyclopédique" from Larousse (1984) has this entry: Pyreneisme 'n' Alp. Practice of mountaineering in the Pyrenees.
 The Grand Robert de la Langue Française (2001) : Pyreneism: 1898 - Beraldi - sport, rare. Alpinism practised in the Pyrenees. 

Definition and quote that refer to "Alpinism": 1876, from "alpine", and "-ism". The sport of climbing mountains. This sport is practised in the Alps - andinism, dolomitism, hymalayism, pyreneism ; ascension, scaling, climbing, mountain, rock climbing...

The online "Trésor de la Langue Française" gives the following definition as a note in its article on Pyrenean: Pyreneism, subst. masc. Relishing climbs and ascensions in the Pyrenean massifs.
 In the 4-volume Robert's Dictionnaire culturel en langue française (2005), the word "pyreneism" is absent but nevertheless cited in the definition of "alpinism": Sport of mountain climbing (himalayism, pyreneism, [...], page 239.
Lastly, the dictionnaire des Pyrénées dedicates two entries to pyreneism. The first one relates to "two articles treating the same subject and reaching two radically opposed conclusions". The second entry deals with the evolution of alpinism under the title: "Contemporary pyreneism of difficulty".

Today the exploration, topographic study and conquest of mountains is perhaps historically ended. This epic has been handled by a number of specialists in France and abroad. In some other countries, other words, other verbs are used to define the practice of climbing a massif, the "making a mountain", with evolutions, technical improvements that are exchanged and universalised.

If the word "alpinism", at least in France, gets detailed into andinism, himalayism,... according to the massif in which the sport is practised, the cultural value of pyreneism in itself remains singular.

Pyreneism, 100 years ago 

When Henri Beraldi received The Pyrenees Prize from the Society of Geographers in Paris, he gave of "pyreneist" (someone who practices pyreneism) the following definition :

In One hundred years in the Pyrenees, one of Henri Beraldi's first studies dedicated to Ramond de Carbonnières at the end of the 18th century, the inventor of Monte Perdido, in which he gives us an idea of a pyreneism that possesses an autonomous literary reference:

This radical approach is clearly a precursor of the socio-anthropological viewpoint as is found in some recent works about mountains. As a modern example we can read that

Writing founded the pyreneism 
So Henri Beraldi insists.
 Pyreneism exists only:

 Pyreneism is geographical.
Henri Beraldi, in his Biblio-pyrenean excursion, places Pyrenean writings in the following manner:

 Pyreneism, who is concerned?

Henri Beraldi at last asks the following question: "Who visits them (the Pyrenees)?"and answers:

Pyreneist literature 
In order to be acknowledged as a pyreneist, one must therefore, according to Beraldi, climb, write and feel - and necessarily publish. The subject of Beraldi's analysis in One hundred years of Pyrenees is the mass of works of all sorts that deal with travelling to the Pyrenees. The variety of visitors brings variety in works:

A striking trait among the crowd of writers cited and commented upon by Beraldi, is the geographical origin: none (or so few) Pyreneans (born in or by the mountain). The pyreneist authors are tourists who came to the Pyrenees for leisure, even if some settled down or tried to settle down there: Ramon, professor in Tarbes, Russell renting La Vignemale for 99 years, Schrader settling in Pau...

In 1908, Louis Le Bondidier says with irony:

Through a severe and ironic critic, Bedraldi thus distinguish among these tourist travellers and writers those who are worthy of being acknowledged as pyreneists. But in the end, those who will be most readily admitted within their ranks are explorers (of the last still-unconquered summits, of the unknown slopes of the Spanish mountains...) and cartographers (geodesic officers as well as enlightened amateurs). The pyreneist remains above all he who has made some mountains in the Pyrenees.

The issue of the first ascent 

The first (the first ascent of a summit or the first hiking on a particular itinerary), is a question found in all the pyreneist literature, at least that of books on summits: who is the author of such summit, of such ascent track? Object of debates, indeed of quarrels.

The very nature of the Pyrenees, a mid-altitude massif practically devoid of icy zones, makes most summits accessible, at least in summer. The matter of their first ascent therefore is of limited interest: occupied since neolithic times by herds and their shepherds, by Pyrenean chamois hunters and by smugglers, these mountains were roamed upon at all times. And the summits, from the view point of their inhabitants, neither more nor less interesting than the pastures: their animals, especially ovines, would sometimes get lost up to the highest altitudes, and these places would occasionally be used as hunting posts. Of course, some conquests have almost certainly been accomplished by tourists, travellers and other pyreneists (the Balaïtous, the high crests of the Vignemale, probably the Maladetta beyond the glaciers...). But the pyreneists themselves sometimes acknowledge it: there already was a sign, a turret, a trace on that summit that one had just conquered. And Ramond de Carbonnières' guides were led to the summit of the Monte Perdido by a Spanish shepherd...

The first ascent is sometimes claimed by the one who calls himself its author: many times Beraldi adds, following the word "first", "by a tourist". The ascent has value, indeed has existence (is publicly known), only when it has been told in writing. Thus it is the writer-tourist who will be acknowledged as its author, and not the mountain locals or the guides who led the ascent.

Names of the summits 

The other big question that from the 19th century onward stirs the world of tourists-writers, those who will be called pyreneists, est the denomination of mountains and summits. A conquest indeed implies naming its object.

Mountain inhabitants, the Pyreneans, have long named the huts, pastures, forests, lakes, passes, sometimes the crests separating two valleys, in short all useful places. They ignored the summits as uninteresting places offhand. But each of these places was named within the environment - and the language, Pyrenean Occitan, Aragonese, Catalan, Basque - of the local community whose people walked them and used them. Hence the identical or near-identical toponyms from one valley to the next one, designating different places. Crests, mountains that divide territories, most often carry two or more names: those given by the mountain locals of each slope who were using those.

Tourists, pyreneists, aimed at naming their mountains: one cannot talk but of that which is identifiable. The names of summits were therefore asked to the guides and shepherds, people who did not name these impediments of the land. The summits became "peak of..." (Peak of Campbieil, for example, to designate the peak that overlooked the Campbieil pasture). And some summits got two names, depending on their author (the Pic de Néouvielle or Pic d'Aubert, for example, depending on the valley through which one climbed it). Following long polemics, the pyreneists ended this disorder with toponymics commissions that baptised the summits with official names which were subsequently used by cartographers.

The multiplication of tourists and their appetite for conquest led to an abundance of names: one came to name anything on a crest that would somewhat differ from the rest. Hence, for example, the proliferation of the three-thousanders (summits higher than 3,000 meter above sea level, a symbolic, even mythic height in the Pyrenees). And, finally, attributing to summits the names of pyreneists as a tribute from their peers (Soum of Ramond, Brulle peak, Schrader peak, Pointe Chausenque...), sometimes during their lifetime.

20th century pyreneism 
The 20th century, following in Henri Beraldi's wake, keeps developing a pyreneist subjectivity linked with the post-exploration and post-conquest. Although at the end of the 19th century another type of conquest already begins with the search for new trails, we witness a new form of conquest based notably on an important technical evolution, European at first, then under the influence of North America. Thus is set, similarly to the "difficulty alpinism", a "difficulty pyreneism".

The difficulty Pyreneism 

Pyreneism, in this meaning, is distinct from alpinism only by the mountain range in which it is practised.

Difficulty pyreneism was not born in the 20th century. Its father is certainly Henri Brulle who, as early as 1878, generalises the use of lifeline and short ice pick during his ascents. With Bazillac, de Monts, d'Astorg, led by guides Célestin Passet and François Bernat-Salles, he achieves many firsts, the north face of Monte Perdido, le corridor of Gaube at the Vignemale, ...

Undeniably the pyreneist enterprise, the adventure, the attraction of the unknown and of the conquest of first order summits, the exploration of new massifs, shrunk as time passed. Likewise, the picturesque having been largely popularised through albums, drawings, paintings, reaching its apex with photography, as for alpinism there needed to conceive a pyreneism with new practices: new routes, north faces, winter pyreneism, solo pyreneism even, which is more akin to conquering one's own self. The creation of the Groupe Pyrénéiste de Haute-Montagne ("High Mountain Pyreneist group") on July 11, 1933, was one of the founding acts of that contemporary "difficulty pyreneism" of which its actors Ollivier, Mailly, Cazalet, Henri barrio, Arlaud and many others used the most modern progression techniques of the time, developed by the Eastern Alpine climbers (use of progression pitons). The post-war period also saw a new generation of climbers getting to grips with all still-untouched faces, all winter runs (the French Jean and Pierre Ravier, Patrice de Bellefon, Despiau, Sarthou..., the Spanish Rabada, Anglada, Montaner, Navarro... and all those who prowled all folds of the range one after the other).

At last, all crests and faces vanquished, the ephemeral ice cascades became the challenge at the end of the 20th century. Practices also evolve: retakes of old routes in free climbing or free solo climbing, including on winter routes.

This "difficulty pyreneism" has also engendered many writers who illustrate the pyreneist passion.

Looking for pyreneism 
The idea by which there exists a pyreneist specificity has always been subjected to debate.

In the line of Beraldi one may find typically pyreneist arguments:

 For J.C. Tournou-Bergonzat:

But the question, laid by the editor of the "Dictionnaire des Pyrénées", brought about two opposite answers.
 For Hélène Saule-Sorbé, "to go make a mountain is also to travel across its history", thus meeting with Jean and Pierre Ravier who use the expression "enter into pyreneism" or Joseph Ribas for whom "the pyreneist integrates the living and the cultural in the landscape, to his eyes a meeting place, a place of exchange".
 For Renaud de Bellefon, pyreneism is "a dumping ground devoid of meaning, because its sensitive and scientific approaches, sometimes opposed to the sport reference, come from all over" and "its invention is primarily efficient in the field of bibliophily (it creates a space for a collection)".

Famous pyreneists 
 Louis-François Ramond de Carbonnières, born in Strasbourg (1755–1827), father of pyreneism (the Ramond family came from Castres).
 Vincent de Chausenque - April 9, 1781, in Gontaud (Lot-et-Garonne) – April 24, 1868, in Gontaud (Lot-et-Garonne).
 Charles-Marie-Étienne Champion Dubois de Nansouty (1815–1895).
 Paul Edouard Wallon, born in Montauban (Tarn-et-Garonne) (1821–1895).
 Eugène Trutat (1840–1910).
 Franz Schrader, born in Bordeaux (1844–1924).
 Félix Régnault (1847–1908).
 Maurice Gourdon, born in Nantes (1847–1947). Biography in S.P.M. Bulletin, Paris. Note to add:
 Henri Brulle (1854–1936). He is considered as the founder of "difficulty pyreneism".
 Henry Russell, 1834 in Toulouse (Haute-Garonne) – 1909 in Biarritz (Basses-Pyrénées). He is one of the pioneers in the conquest of the Pyrenees.
 Henri Beraldi, February 6, 1849, in Paris (8th arrondissement) – March 31, 1931, in Paris. He is a famous French pyreneist.
 Pierre-gaston Sacaze, autodidact botanist shepherd. We owe him a monumental Pyrenean herb book.
 Henri Lefebvre, June 16, 1901, in Hagetmau (Landes departement) – in 1991 in Navarrenx (Pyrénées-Atlantiques). He is a geographer and sociologist who wrote several books on the Pyrenees.
 Jean Fourcassié, born in Albi on October 17, 1886, died in Calella de Palafrugell, Costa Brava, Spain, on July 15, 1955.
 René d'Astorg, (1860–1940)
 Georges Ledormeur (1867–1952), author of the Ledormeur guide: "Les Pyrénées Centrales - du Val d'Aran à la Vallée d'Aspe" (Central Pyrenees - from val d'Aran to the Asp valley").
 The Cadiers brothers: George, Henri, Albert, Edouard and Charles

See also 

 Alpinism
 Naturalism
 Romantism
 Canigou

References

External links 
 See the well-documented article (in French) by Renaud de Bellefon, L’écueil des revues pyrénéistes: la tentation de l’érudition rétrospective ("The pitfall of pyreneist periodicals: the temptation of retrospective erudition") in Revue de Civilisation Contemporaine ("Contemporary Civilisation magazine") of the Université de Bretagne Occidentale Europes/Amériques ("University of Occidental Brittany Europes/Americas").
 History and chronology of the first ascents in the Pyrenees
 Portraits of pyreneists
 An approach of Pyreneism
 Photos des Pyrénées en noir et blanc" ("Black and white photos of the Pyrenees") (1945-1965) - ArtPyr ed.
 History of pyreneism and biographies of great pyreneists
 Les Amis du Livre Pyrénéen ("Friends of the Pyrenean Book") (pyreneism bibliography and history)
 Site of the Pin à Crochets editions (pyreneist bibliography) (pin à crochets is Pinus uncinata)

Mountaineering techniques
Mountaineering in France